Cete may refer to:

People
Çetes, Muslim irregulars active in Anatolia in the early 20th century

Surname
Duygu Çete (born 1989), Turkish female Paralympic judoka

Places
 Çetë, Kavajë, a village in the municipality of Kavajë, Tirana County, Albania
 Çetë, Berat, a village in the municipality of Dimal, Berat County, Albania
 Çetë, Korçë, a village in the municipality of Devoll, Korçë County, Albania
 Cete, Portugal

Biology
 The English collective noun for a group of badgers
 Cete (clade), encompassing Cetacea (whales, dolphins, and porpoises) and Mesonychia (extinct ancestors)